José Desmarets (16 September 1925 – 9 August 2019) was a Belgian politician in the Christian Social Party who served as a minister in the government of Wilfried Martens (1979–1981). In 1982 Yad Vashem recognised Desmarets and his father as Righteous Among the Nations for having risked their lives to help a Jewish fugitive during the Second World War, when he was still a student.

Desmarets was born in Schaerbeek, Belgium, on 16 September 1925,  the son of a pastry baker. He studied political science and law, and began his political career as an alderman in Uccle. He served in turn as Minister of Defence (1979–1980), Minister of Planning (1980) and Minister of the Middle Classes (1980–1981). He died on 9 August 2019 at the age of 93. He was remembered as a man who had always fought against both right-wing and left-wing extremism.

References

1925 births
2019 deaths
Belgian politicians
Belgian Righteous Among the Nations